Alisa Glinka (born 10 October 1987) is a Russian/Moldovan equestrian athlete and actress. She competed at the FEI World Cup Finals in Leipzig in 2022 as first Moldovan rider in history. Glinka also represented Moldova at the 2021 European Dressage Championships in Hagen, Germany. In 2017 Glinka starred in the Russian drama film Nearest and Dearest in which she played the role of Efim's lover.

References

1987 births
Living people
Moldovan female equestrians
Moldovan dressage riders
Russian female equestrians
Russian dressage riders